Deliabad (also Romanized as Delīābād and Dalīābād; also known as Dalābād) is a village in Shirvan Rural District, in the Central District of Borujerd County, Lorestan Province, Iran. At the 2006 census, its population was 509, in 126 families.

References 

Towns and villages in Borujerd County